Landis Shoe Company Building is a historic factory building located at Palmyra, Lebanon County, Pennsylvania. It was built in 1905-1906 and expanded in 1911, and is a three-story, brick building on a stone foundation.  It is 26 bays wide by 4 bays deep.

It was added to the National Register of Historic Places in 1980.

See also 
 Hoyt Shoe Factory:  NRHP-listed shoe factory in Manchester, New Hampshire
 Kimball Brothers Shoe Factory: NRHP-listed shoe factory in Manchester, New Hampshire

References

Industrial buildings and structures on the National Register of Historic Places in Pennsylvania
Industrial buildings completed in 1911
Buildings and structures in Lebanon County, Pennsylvania
Shoe factories
1911 establishments in Pennsylvania
National Register of Historic Places in Lebanon County, Pennsylvania